Michael Hayes (born October 16, 1980) is an American mixed martial artist currently competing in the Light Heavyweight division. A professional competitor since 2007, he has competed for Bellator, Strikeforce, Cage Warriors, King of the Cage, the Palace Fighting Championship, the World Series of Fighting, KSW, and Fight Nights Global.

Mixed martial arts career
Hayes' debut for Bellator was on June 10, 2010, at Bellator 21, where he defeated Steve Banks by unanimous decision.

Hayes entered the second heavyweight tournament in Bellator's fifth season.  He faced UFC veteran Neil Grove at Bellator 52 and won the back-and-forth bout via split decision.

Hayes faced Andreas Kraniotakes for the vacant Cage Warriors Fighting Championship heavyweight title on March 16, 2012.  He won the bout and title via submission in the third round.

Hayes fought D.J. Linderman in a rematch for the Cage Warriors Fighting Championship heavyweight title at Cage Warriors 47 and lost the fight via decision.

Hayes was expected to fight former UFC light heavyweight veteran Thiago Silva at Fight Time 20 on August 29, 2014. However, Silva sustained a knee injury and the fight was cancelled.

Championships and accomplishments
Cage Warriors
CWFC Heavyweight Championship (One time)

Mixed martial arts record

|-
| Loss
| align=center| 20–12–2
| Tony Lopez
| Decision (unanimous)
| King of the Cage: Provoked
| 
| align=center| 5
| align=center| 5:00
| Lincoln City, Oregon, United States
|Light Heavyweight debut; for KOTC Light Heavyweight Championship.
|-
| Win
| align=center| 20–11–2
| Jamelle Jones
| Decision (split)
| King of the Cage: Battle Zone
| 
| align=center| 3
| align=center| 5:00
| Worley, Idaho, United States
|Catchweight (215 lbs) bout.
|-
| Loss
| align=center| 19–11–2
| Josh Copeland
| Decision (unanimous)
| WSOF 29
| 
| align=center| 3
| align=center| 5:00
| Greeley, Colorado, United States
| 
|-
| Draw
| align=center| 19–10–2
| Trevor Prangley
| Draw (split)
| King of the Cage: Awakening
| 
| align=center| 3
| align=center| 5:00
| Worley, Idaho, United States
| 
|-
| Loss
| align=center| 19–10–1
| Josh Queen
| Decision (unanimous)
| KOTC: Short Fuse
| 
| align=center| 3
| align=center| 5:00
| Worley, Idaho, United States
| 
|-
| Loss
| align=center| 19–9–1
| Virgil Zwicker
| KO (punch)
| KSW 25
| 
| align=center| 1
| align=center| 1:12
| Wroclaw, Poland
| 
|-
| Win
| align=center| 19–8–1
| Jeff Monson
| TKO (head kick and punches)
| Cage Warrior Combat 9
| 
| align=center| 3
| align=center| 1:21
| Kent, Washington, United States
| 
|-
| Loss
| align=center| 18–8–1
| D.J. Linderman
| Decision (unanimous)
| War MMA 1
| 
| align=center| 3
| align=center| 5:00
| Stockton, California, United States
| 
|-
| Loss
| align=center| 18–7–1
| Ruslan Magomedov
| Decision (unanimous)
| Fight Nights: Battle of Moscow 10
| 
| align=center| 3
| align=center| 5:00
| Moscow, Russia
| 
|-
| Loss
| align=center| 18–6–1
| Andrei Arlovski
| Decision (unanimous)
| Fight Nights: Battle of Moscow 9
| 
| align=center| 3
| align=center| 5:00
| Moscow, Russia
| 
|-
| Loss
| align=center| 18–5–1
| D.J. Linderman
| Decision (unanimous)
| Cage Warriors: 47
| 
| align=center| 5
| align=center| 5:00
| Dublin, Ireland
| Lost CWFC Heavyweight Championship.
|-
| Win
| align=center| 18–4–1
| Andreas Kraniotakes
| Submission (Kimura)
| Cage Warriors Fight Night 4
| 
| align=center| 3
| align=center| 4:20
| Dubai, United Arab Emirates
| Won vacant CWFC Heavyweight Championship.
|-
| Win
| align=center| 17–4–1
| Neil Grove
| Decision (split)
| Bellator 52
| 
| align=center| 3
| align=center| 5:00
| Lake Charles, Louisiana, United States
| Bellator Season Five Heavyweight Tournament Quarterfinal.
|-
| Win
| align=center| 16–4–1
| Tony King
| Submission (rear-naked choke)
| Cage Warrior Combat: The Fight Factory
| 
| align=center| 3
| align=center| 1:32
| Marysville, Washington, United States
| 
|-
| Win
| align=center| 15–4–1
| Matt Kovacs
| Submission (rear-naked choke)
| Rumble on the Ridge 16
| 
| align=center| 3
| align=center| 4:23
| Snoqualmie, Washington, United States
| 
|-
| Win
| align=center| 14–4–1
| Josh Bennett
| TKO (doctor stoppage)
| ROTR 15: Vindication
| 
| align=center| 1
| align=center| 1:37
| Snoqualmie, Washington, United States
| 
|-
| Win
| align=center| 13–4–1
| Matt Walker
| Submission (rear-naked choke)
| ROTR 14: Defiance
| 
| align=center| 2
| align=center| 4:37
| Snoqualmie, Washington, United States
| 
|-
| Loss
| align=center| 12–4–1
| Alexey Oleynik
| Decision (split)
| Bellator 26
| 
| align=center| 3
| align=center| 5:00
| Kansas City, Missouri, United States
| Bellator Season Three Heavyweight Tournament Quarterfinal.
|-
| Win
| align=center| 12–3–1
| Steven Banks
| Decision (unanimous)
| Bellator 21
| 
| align=center| 3
| align=center| 5:00
| Hollywood, Florida, United States
| 
|-
| Win
| align=center| 11–3–1
| Daniel Stewart
| Decision (unanimous)
| Rumble on the Ridge 6: Regeneration
| 
| align=center| 3
| align=center| 5:00
| Snoqualmie, Washington, United States
| 
|-
| Win
| align=center| 10–3–1
| Fabiano Scherner
| KO (punch)
| ROTR 6: Final Countdown
| 
| align=center| 2
| align=center| 3:50
| Snoqualmie, Washington, United States
| 
|-
| Win
| align=center| 9–3–1
| Josh Queen
| KO (punch)
| SF 26: Domination
| 
| align=center| 1
| align=center| 4:53
| Grand Ronde, Oregon, United States
| 
|-
| Loss
| align=center| 8–3–1
| Devin Cole
| Decision (unanimous)
| Rumble on the Ridge 4
| 
| align=center| 3
| align=center| 3:00
| Snoqualmie, Washington, United States
| 
|-
| Win
| align=center| 8–2–1
| Daniel Krug
| TKO (punches)
| CageSport 6
| 
| align=center| 1
| align=center| 5:00
| Tacoma, Washington, United States
| 
|-
| Draw
| align=center| 7–2–1
| Devin Cole
| Majority Draw
| Fight Night: Bikes & Brawls
| 
| align=center| 3
| align=center| 5:00
| Canyonville, Oregon, United States
| 
|-
| Loss
| align=center| 7–2
| D.J. Linderman
| Decision (unanimous)
| Alliance: The Uprising
| 
| align=center| 3
| align=center| 5:00
| Kent, Washington, United States
| 
|-
| Loss
| align=center| 7–1
| Mario Miranda
| Decision (unanimous)
| Carnage at the Creek 5
| 
| align=center| 3
| align=center| 5:00
| Shelton, Washington, United States
| 
|-
| Win
| align=center| 7–0
| Rick Cheek
| TKO (submission to punches)
| PFC: Best of Both Worlds
| 
| align=center| 2
| align=center| 1:01
| Lemoore, California, United States
| 
|-
| Win
| align=center| 6–0
| Jeremiah Constant
| TKO (injury)
| CageSport MMA
| 
| align=center| 1
| align=center| 2:52
| Tacoma, Washington, United States
| 
|-
| Win
| align=center| 5–0
| Josh Bennett
| Submission (rear naked choke)
| CageSport MMA
| 
| align=center| 3
| align=center| 3:01
| Tacoma, Washington, United States
| 
|-
| Win
| align=center| 4–0
| Kyle Keeney
| Decision (unanimous)
| CS: Freedom Fights
| 
| align=center| 3
| align=center| 5:00
| Tacoma, Washington, United States
| 
|-
| Win
| align=center| 3–0
| Matt Kovacs
| Decision (unanimous)
| Strikeforce: At The Dome
| 
| align=center| 3
| align=center| 5:00
| Tacoma, Washington, United States
| 
|-
| Win
| align=center| 2–0
| Ryan Hills
| Submission (rear-naked choke)
| GF: A New Beginning for an Ancient Art
| 
| align=center| 1
| align=center| 2:06
| Kirkland, Washington, United States
| 
|-
| Win
| align=center| 1–0
| Ian Allen
| TKO (punches)
| RSU: Black Eye Invitational 6
| 
| align=center| 2
| align=center| 2:00
| Bellevue, Washington, United States
|

See also

 List of male mixed martial artists

References

External links

Living people
American male mixed martial artists
Heavyweight mixed martial artists
Mixed martial artists from Washington (state)
1980 births
People from Cle Elum, Washington